Münster is a municipality in the district of Darmstadt-Dieburg, Hessen, Germany. It has a population of 14,610 (as of 2016). It is situated 3 km north of Dieburg, and 24 km southeast of Frankfurt. The town was first mentioned in documents over 750 years ago. In 1971 the adjacent town of Altheim agreed to become part of Münster.

References

 At the county Web site

Darmstadt-Dieburg